Mangas may refer to: 

 Manga, comics or graphic novels originating from Japan
 Mangas, a social group in the Belle Époque era's counterculture of Greece
 Mangas (TV channel), in France
 Mangas District, in Bolognesi province, Peru
 Mangas, New Mexico, U.S., an extinct town
 Mangas language, or Mantsi language, in Nigeria
 Mangas Coloradas (c. 1793 – 1863), Apache tribal chief

See also

Manga (disambiguation)